Hu Xuefeng (born 14 January 1980 in Changshu, Suzhou, Jiangsu) is a Chinese basketball coach and professional player who plays for the Jiangsu Dragons of the Chinese Basketball Association (CBA) since 1999. He was also a member of the final roster of the Chinese national basketball team in 2009 Asia Championship.

As a guard, Hu is a defensive expert. He holds the CBA records for career steals. He is second to Lü Xiaoming in career assists in CBA. He is one of the two players (only domestic player) who has ever achieved a quadruple-double in CBA games. He also made triple-double several times and one of them was made of assists, steals, and rebounds, but not points.

External links 
 Hu Xuefeng at sina.com

1980 births
Living people
Asian Games gold medalists for China
Asian Games medalists in basketball
Basketball players at the 2006 Asian Games
Basketball players from Jiangsu
Chinese men's basketball players
Jiangsu Dragons players
Point guards
Sportspeople from Suzhou

Medalists at the 2006 Asian Games